Jim Delaney is a professional rugby league footballer who last played as a  for Doncaster in Kingstone Press League 1.

Delaney has previously spent time on loan at the Hemel Stags, and Doncaster in Kingstone Press League 1.
Delaney’s cousin Brad Delaney also plays for Dewsbury, and both are related to former player Paul Delaney.

He has played for the Dewsbury Rams in the Kingstone Press Championship.

References

External links
Dewsbury Rams profile

Living people
English rugby league players
Dewsbury Rams players
Doncaster R.L.F.C. players
Hemel Stags players
Rugby league hookers
Rugby league players from Yorkshire
Year of birth missing (living people)